Myolepta is a cosmopolitan genus of hoverflies most closely related to the genus Lepidomyia

Species

Subgenus: Myolepta
Myolepta auricaudata (Williston, 1891)
Myolepta aurinota (Hine, 1903)
Myolepta camillae Weems, 1956
Myolepta difformis (Strobl, 1909)
Myolepta dolorosa (Hull, 1941)
Myolepta dubia (Fabricius, 1805)
Myolepta greeni Hull, 1941i
Myolepta haemorrhoidalis (Philippi, 1865)
Myolepta luctuosa (Bigot, 1857a)
Myolepta lunulata Bigot, 1884
Myolepta luteola (Gmelin, 1790)
Myolepta nausicaa (Hull, 1937a)
Myolepta nigra (Loew, 1972)
Myolepta nigritarsis Coe, 1957
Myolepta obscura (Becher, 1882)
Myolepta potens (Harris, 1776)
Myolepta strigilata (Loew, 1872)
Myolepta vara (Panzer, 1798)
Myolepta varipes (Loew, 1869) 
 
Subgenus: Protolepidostola
Myolepta braziliana (Shannon, 1927a)
Myolepta evansi Thompson, 1968
Myolepta marinonii (Marinoni, 2004)
Myolepta minuta Fluke, 1956
Myolepta problematica Thompson, 1968
Myolepta scintillans (Hull, 1946b)

References

Hoverfly genera
Muscomorph flies of Europe
Diptera of North America
Eristalinae
Taxa named by Edward Newman